The twin sisters Ferhan & Ferzan Önder (born October 2, 1965, at Tokat, Turkey) are Turkish-Austrian pianists who perform mostly as a piano duo.

At the age of seven, they moved to Ankara to study in the State Conservatory. Already at the age of 14, they won a Jury Special Award at the Concorso Pianistico Internazionale Alessandro Casagrande in Terni, Italy.

Next, they won the "First Prize" at the International Piano Duo Competition in Hamburg, Germany. 
In 1985, after winning a competition, which led to a concert in Vienna, the twins decided to move to Austria, where they studied at the Academy of Music in Vienna with Noel Flores and Paul Badura-Skoda. In the academy, they also met Alfons Kontarsky, who became their mentor and a close friend until his death.

The twin sisters produced a number of CDs. Their CD Vivaldi Reflections, which had been released under the label EMI Records in 2001, won the "Echo Klassik Prize" of the German Phono Academy. Their next CD was 1001 Nights (EMI, 2003) with adaptations of Rimsky-Korsakov, Borodin, Balakirev and Mozart.

In 2003, they were appointed UNICEF goodwill ambassadors.

References

Living people
1965 births
People from Tokat
Identical twin females
Turkish twins
Hacettepe University Ankara State Conservatory alumni
University of Music and Performing Arts Vienna alumni
Twin musical duos
Turkish classical pianists
Turkish women pianists
Women classical pianists
UNICEF Goodwill Ambassadors
20th-century classical pianists
21st-century classical pianists
20th-century Turkish women musicians
21st-century Turkish women musicians
Female musical duos
Austrian people of Turkish descent
Turkish emigrants to Austria
Naturalised citizens of Austria
20th-century women pianists
21st-century women pianists